Ashley Daniel Tabor-King OBE (born May 1977) is a British businessman, the founder and president of Global, the Media & Entertainment Group, the largest commercial radio group in Europe and one of the leading outdoor (OOH) advertising companies in the UK.

Early life
Ashley Daniel Tabor was born to a Jewish family in May 1977, the son of Doreen and Michael Tabor, who made his fortune through bookmaking, horsebreeding and property.

Career
Tabor-King once worked for Simon Cowell.

In 2008, with cash provided by his father and other lenders, he took over GCap Radio, the group behind Capital Radio and Classic FM, and founded Global.

Honours
In the 2017 Birthday Honours, Tabor-King received an OBE.

Personal life
Tabor-King is married to George Tabor-King. Tabor-King has lived in The Knightsbridge Apartments complex since 2006, in an apartment he bought for £15 million. In 2017 he bought the next-door apartment for £90 million. In October 2017, Westminster City Council's planning department turned down his plan to combine the two apartments, which would have created a ten-bedroom penthouse estimated to be worth £200 million. Following the rejection of his planning application to amalgamate the two units, Tabor-King submitted a planning application for the installation of two internal doors, creating a separation lobby between apartments. This plan was approved in June, allowing Tabor-King to combine the two units into one larger apartment. A subsequent planning application in February 2019 added further internal doors between the two apartments. Now complete, the apartment consists of 10 bedroom suites, two kitchens, a laundry room, two living rooms, a cinema, a play room and a gym. The apartment is now estimated  to be the second most expensive property in the UK, only behind 2-8a Rutland Gate.

Tabor-King also owns a mansion in Los Angeles. The site was purchased from Megan Ellison, daughter of Larry Ellison, for $26.25 million. Tabor-King also owns a $21 million apartment in Barbados.

References

1977 births
Living people
British Jews
Officers of the Order of the British Empire
British LGBT businesspeople